Screws v. United States, 325 U.S. 91 (1945), was a 1945 Supreme Court case that made it difficult for the federal government to bring prosecutions when local government officials killed African-Americans in an extra-judicial manner.

Claude Screws, the sheriff of Baker County, Georgia, arrested Robert "Bobby" Hall, an African American, on January 29, 1943. Hall had allegedly stolen a tire, and was alleged to have tried to fight back against Screws and two of his deputies during the arrest.  Hall was arrested at his home. Screws then beat Hall to death.

The local U.S. attorney then convened a grand jury which indicted Screws on charges of violating Hall's civil rights. Screws was then convicted at the federal court house in Albany, Georgia. The conviction was upheld by the Circuit Court and then appealed to the Supreme Court. While the case was moving through the courts Screws was reelected as sheriff by a very wide margin.

The Supreme Court, in a decision authored by William O. Douglas, ruled that the federal government had not shown that Screws had the intention of violating Hall's civil rights when he killed him. This ruling greatly reduced the frequency with which federal civil rights cases were brought over the next few years.

See also
 List of United States Supreme Court cases, volume 325
 Enforcement Act of 1870

References

Further reading

External links
 

United States Supreme Court cases
1945 in United States case law
Civil rights movement case law
United States Supreme Court cases of the Stone Court
Lynching deaths in Georgia (U.S. state)
African-American history of Georgia (U.S. state)